The 2005–06 Los Angeles Clippers season was their 36th season in the NBA and their 22nd in Los Angeles. The Clippers finished with 47 wins and 35 losses in the regular season, their best record since the 1974–75 season when they were the Buffalo Braves and made the playoffs for the first time since 1997 as the 6th seed, finishing with a better record than their crosstown rival, the Los Angeles Lakers, who finished two games behind them with a 45–37 record as the 7th seed, for the first time since 1992.

In the playoffs, the Clippers defeated the 3rd seeded Denver Nuggets in the First Round in five games, marking the first time they have won a series since moving to California in 1978. The Clippers would then advance to the Semi-finals, where they lose in seven games to the Phoenix Suns. The Suns had previously defeated the Clippers' Staples Center co-tenants, the Los Angeles Lakers, in seven games in the First Round after being down 1–3 in the series.

The Clippers would not return to the playoffs until 2012.

Draft picks

Roster

Regular season

Season standings

Record vs. opponents

Game log

Playoffs

|- align="center" bgcolor="#ccffcc"
| 1
| April 22
| Denver
| W 89–87
| Elton Brand (21)
| Chris Kaman (13)
| Sam Cassell (7)
| Staples Center19,162
| 1–0
|- align="center" bgcolor="#ccffcc"
| 2
| April 24
| Denver
| W 98–87
| Cuttino Mobley (21)
| Elton Brand (11)
| Sam Cassell (11)
| Staples Center18,794
| 2–0
|- align="center" bgcolor="#ffcccc"
| 3
| April 27
| @ Denver
| L 87–94
| Corey Maggette (23)
| Brand, Livingston (8)
| Brand, Livingston (4)
| Pepsi Center19,099
| 2–1
|- align="center" bgcolor="#ccffcc"
| 4
| April 29
| @ Denver
| W 100–86
| Corey Maggette (19)
| Elton Brand (10)
| Shaun Livingston (6)
| Pepsi Center19,099
| 3–1
|- align="center" bgcolor="#ccffcc"
| 5
| May 1
| Denver
| W 101–83
| Maggette, Mobley (23)
| Elton Brand (13)
| Shaun Livingston (14)
| Staples Center18,648
| 4–1
|-

|- align="center" bgcolor="#ffcccc"
| 1
| May 8
| @ Phoenix
| L 123–130
| Elton Brand (40)
| Elton Brand (9)
| Shaun Livingston (9)
| US Airways Center18,422
| 0–1
|- align="center" bgcolor="#ccffcc"
| 2
| May 10
| @ Phoenix
| W 122–97
| Elton Brand (27)
| Chris Kaman (16)
| Sam Cassell (6)
| US Airways Center18,422
| 1–1
|- align="center" bgcolor="#ffcccc"
| 3
| May 12
| Phoenix
| L 91–94
| Elton Brand (20)
| Corey Maggette (14)
| Elton Brand (8)
| Staples Center19,877
| 1–2
|- align="center" bgcolor="#ccffcc"
| 4
| May 14
| Phoenix
| W 114–107
| Elton Brand (30)
| Corey Maggette (15)
| Sam Cassell (9)
| Staples Center19,897
| 2–2
|- align="center" bgcolor="#ffcccc"
| 5
| May 16
| @ Phoenix
| L 118–125 (2OT)
| Elton Brand (33)
| Elton Brand (15)
| Brand, Cassell (5)
| US Airways Center18,422
| 2–3
|- align="center" bgcolor="#ccffcc"
| 6
| May 18
| Phoenix
| W 118–106
| Elton Brand (30)
| Elton Brand (13)
| Sam Cassell (8)
| Staples Center19,985
| 3–3
|- align="center" bgcolor="#ffcccc"
| 7
| May 22
| @ Phoenix
| L 107–127
| Elton Brand (36)
| Brand, Maggette (9)
| Sam Cassell (6)
| US Airways Center18,422
| 3–4
|-

Player statistics

Season

Playoffs

Awards, records and milestones

Awards
 general manager Elgin Baylor won the NBA Executive of the Year.
 Forward Elton Brand won the NBA Sportsmanship Award.

All-Star
 Elton Brand selected as a reserve forward for the Western Conference All-Stars.  This is his second All-Star Game appearance.

Injuries and surgeries

Transactions
The Clippers have been involved in the following transactions during the 2005-06 season.

Trades

Free Agents

Additions

Subtractions

See also
 2005–06 NBA season

References

Los Angeles Clippers seasons